Lasek is a Polish forest hamlet in Gmina Łuków, Łuków County, Lublin Voivodeship.

References

Villages in Łuków County